The 2018 Minnesota gubernatorial election took place on November 6, to elect the 41st Governor of Minnesota as incumbent Democratic governor Mark Dayton chose not to run for re-election for a third term. The Democratic nominee was congressman Tim Walz from Minnesota's 1st congressional district while the Republicans nominated Hennepin County commissioner Jeff Johnson. The Independence Party of Minnesota didn't field a candidate for the first time since 1994. Going into the election the polls showed Walz ahead and the race was characterized as lean or likely DFL.

In the end, Walz went on to defeat Johnson by the largest margin for a DFL candidate since 1986. Walz had also received more votes than any gubernatorial candidate in Minnesota's history. This is the first Minnesota gubernatorial election since 1959 where any party won more than two consecutive elections. This was also the first time since 1998 where the party of the incumbent president lost.

Democratic–Farmer–Labor primary

Candidates

Nominated
 Tim Walz, U.S. Representative
 Running mate: Peggy Flanagan, State Representative

Eliminated in primary
 Tim Holden, real estate investor and candidate for Mayor of Saint Paul in 2017
 Running mate: James P. Mellin II
 Erin Murphy, State Representative
 Running mate: Erin Maye Quade, State Representative
 Olé Savior, perennial candidate
 Running mate: Chris Edman
 Lori Swanson, Attorney General of Minnesota
 Running mate: Rick Nolan, U.S. Representative

Withdrawn
 Paul Thissen, State Representative, former House Minority Leader, and former Speaker of the House
 Chris Coleman, former Mayor of Saint Paul
 Tina Liebling, State Representative
 Rebecca Otto, Minnesota State Auditor
Running mate: Zarina Baber, IT professional

Declined
 Tom Bakk, Minority Leader of the Minnesota Senate and candidate for governor in 2010
 Mark Dayton, incumbent governor
 Debra Hilstrom, state representative and candidate for Secretary of State in 2014 (running for Minnesota Attorney General)
 Amy Klobuchar, U.S. Senator (running for re-election)
 Rick Nolan, U.S. Representative (running for Lieutenant Governor)
 R. T. Rybak, former vice chair of the Democratic National Committee, former Mayor of Minneapolis and candidate for governor in 2010
 Tina Smith, U.S. Senator (running for election)

Endorsements

Polling

Straw poll

On February 6, 2018 the DFL conducted a statewide straw poll among registered Democrats in Minnesota. Caucus-goers were scheduled to elect delegates to their party's Senate district and county conventions, which in turn will elect state convention delegates who will endorse candidates for governor, two U.S. Senate seats, attorney general, state auditor and secretary of state. Congressional district delegates will endorse U.S. House candidates. Since the straw poll the three lowest performing candidates withdrew from the race (Paul Thissen, Chris Coleman, and Tina Liebling).

Results

Republican primary

Candidates

Nominated
 Jeff Johnson, Hennepin County Commissioner, former state representative, and nominee for governor in 2014
 Running mate: Donna Bergstrom, retired Marine Corps intelligence officer

Eliminated in primary
 Mathew Kruse
 Running mate: Theresa Loeffler
 Tim Pawlenty, former governor and candidate for President of the United States in 2012
 Running mate: Michelle Fischbach, incumbent lieutenant governor

Withdrew
 Phillip Parrish, Naval Reserve intelligence officer and candidate for the U.S. Senate in 2014
 Mary Giuliani Stephens, mayor of Woodbury
 Running mate: Jeff Backer, state representative
 Christopher Chamberlin (running for MN-05)
 Matt Dean, state representative
 Keith Downey, former chairman of the Republican Party of Minnesota and former state representative
 Blake Huffman, Ramsey County Commissioner
 David Osmek, state senator

Declined
 Sarah Anderson, state representative
 Michele Bachmann, former U.S. Representative and candidate for president in 2012
 Michelle Benson, state senator and candidate for lieutenant governor in 2014
 Kurt Daudt, Speaker of the Minnesota House of Representatives (Endorsed Pawlenty) 
 Tom Emmer, U.S. Representative (running for re-election) and nominee for governor in 2010
 Karin Housley, state senator (running for the U.S. Senate)
 Amy Koch, former Majority Leader of the Minnesota Senate
 Mike Lindell, CEO of My Pillow
 Mike McFadden, businessman and nominee for the U.S. Senate in 2014
 Carla Nelson, state senator
 Erik Paulsen, U.S. Representative (running for re-election)
 Julie Rosen, state senator (endorsed Pawlenty)
 Rich Stanek, Hennepin County Sheriff and former state representative (running for reelection as sheriff)

Endorsements

Polling

Results

Third parties and independents

Candidates

Declared
Josh Welter (Libertarian Party)
 Chris Wright (Grassroots-Legalize Cannabis Party), Grassroots Party nominee for governor in 1998, 2010 and 2014

General election

Predictions

Debates
The debate season began only three days after the primaries with Johnson and Walz participating in two debates on Friday, August 17. A third debate was held Friday, August 31.

Endorsements

Polling

with Erin Murphy and Tim Pawlenty

with Lori Swanson and Tim Pawlenty

with Tim Walz and Tim Pawlenty

with Lori Swanson and Jeff Johnson

Results

Voter demographics

See also
 2018 Minnesota elections
 2018 Minnesota House of Representatives election
 2018 United States House of Representatives elections in Minnesota
 2018 United States Senate special election in Minnesota
 2018 United States Senate election in Minnesota

References

External links
Elections & Voting - Minnesota Secretary of State
Candidates at Vote Smart
Candidates at Ballotpedia

Official campaign websites
Jeff Johnson (R) for Governor
Tim Walz (DFL) for Governor
Josh Welter (L) for Governor
Chris Wright (G-LC) for Governor

Gubernatorial
2018
2018 United States gubernatorial elections